Lees Hall Roman Camp is an archaeological site, a Roman camp near Hadrian's Wall, in Northumberland, England. It is near Haltwhistle and adjacent to the B6318 road.

Description
The camp is one of over 40 temporary Roman camps recorded near Hadrian's Wall; they may have been marching camps, or were occupied by troops constructing the wall, or were used during military training. This camp is unusual in having an outwork surrounding the main defences, suggesting that it was used for more than one campaign season.

There are extensive views to the north and east; a small stream, running from west to east, lies within the fort.

There are four gateways, which are in the centre of the west and east side and offset to the east on the north and south sides, implying that the camp faced east.

References

Roman sites in Northumberland
Scheduled monuments in Northumberland
Archaeological sites in Northumberland
Hadrian's Wall